Teresa Jacobs (born April 6, 1958 in Baltimore, Maryland) is the current chairwoman of the Orange County Public School Board. Jacobs previously served as Mayor of Orange County from 2011 until taking office as school board chair in November 2018, also having represented district 1 on the  Orange County Board of County Commissioners from 2000 to 2008.

Early life, education, and family
Jacobs was raised in Miami and Jupiter, Florida. She is a graduate of Florida State University, graduating cum laude with a degree in economics.  Teresa Jacobs is married to Bruce.  They have four children together.

Early business career
Teresa Jacobs moved to Atlanta, Georgia in 1981.  She was Assistant Vice President of National Bank of Georgia, Atlanta from 1981 to 1989.

Political career
Teresa Jacobs represented District 1 on the Board of County Commissioners, which encompasses southwest Orange County from Winter Garden to Hunter's Creek. She was elected in 2000, re-elected in 2004, and stepped down in 2008 due to term limits. Jacobs was credited with championing new ethics rules for county elected officials, and successfully strengthening local laws to prevent school overcrowding.  She was elected President of the  Florida Association of Counties in 2007.

2010 Orange County Mayor campaign
Jacobs announced that she planned to run for Mayor of Orange County in 2010.  Jacobs was the last candidate to enter the race.  She was opposed by Bill Segal, Linda Stewart, and Matthew Falconer.  On August 24, 2010, Linda Stewart (19%) and Matthew Falconer (15%) were eliminated in the primary election.  Teresa Jacobs (42%) and Bill Segal (22%) both advanced to the general election in a run off.  In the general election on November 2, 2010, Teresa Jacobs resoundingly defeated Bill Segal, 68% - 32%, despite being out fund raised 2-1.

2014 Orange County Mayor campaign
Despite Val Demings having been in the race early on, she dropped out leaving Teresa Jacobs winning the election unopposed.

Electoral history

Current or Previous State and Regional Boards

President, Florida Association of Counties (FAC)
Chair, East Central Florida Regional Planning Council (ECFRPC)
Member, Central Florida MPO Alliance, Member
Chair, Central Florida Smart Growth Alliance (CFSGA)
Member, MetroPlan Orlando Board
Gubernatorial Appointee, Wekiva River Basin Commission
Member, Myregion.org Executive Board of Directors
Member, Florida Transportation Plan Steering Committee
International Drive Master Transit and Improvement District Governing Board, Chair Person
Lynx Board of Directors
Orlando-Orange County Expressway Authority, Board of Directors
Orlando-Orange County Expressway Authority, Finance Committee
Greater Orlando Aviation Authority (GOAA), Board of Directors
Central Florida Commuter Rail Commission (Sunrail), Vice Chairman
Visit Orlando Board, Ex-Officio Director
County Executives of America, Board of Directors
Coalition for the Homeless of Central Florida
Tourism Development Council (TDC), Chairman
Central Florida Regional Commission on Homelessness, Co-Chair
Congress of Regional Leaders, Member
MyRegion.Org, Executive Board of Directors
St. John’s River Alliance

See also
Orange County Mayor
Board of County Commissioners
Orange County, Florida
Central Florida

References

External links 
 Teresa Jacobs Campaign Website

1958 births
County commissioners in Florida
County executives in Florida
Florida Republicans
Living people
Florida State University alumni
21st-century American politicians
21st-century American women politicians
People from Orange County, Florida
Politicians from Miami
People from Baltimore
People from Jupiter, Florida